Copecrypta ruficauda is a species of bristle fly in the family Tachinidae.

References

Further reading

External links

 

Tachininae
Articles created by Qbugbot
Insects described in 1867